Amore all'italiana (Love Italian Style) is a 1965 Italian comedy film directed by Steno. The film stars Walter Chiari.

Cast
Walter Chiari
Raimondo Vianello
Paolo Panelli
Paolo Carlini
Vivi Bach
Luigi De Filippo
Alicia Brandet
Rika Dialina
Isabella Biagini
Adriana Ambesi
Nicole Faida
Susanna Clemm  (as Susanna Clem)
Silvia Daniels
Lucretia Love  (as Lucrezia Love)
Angela Portaluri
Bruno Scipioni

External links 
 

1965 films
1960s Italian-language films
Italian black-and-white films
1965 comedy films
Italian comedy films
1960s Italian films